Arnaldo "Cherry" Sentimenti (24 May 1914 – 12 June 1997), also known as Sentimenti II, was a former Italian football player and coach from Bomporto in the Province of Modena, who played as a goalkeeper.

Career
Sentimenti played club football for S.S.C. Napoli, where he spent over a decade, also serving as the team's captain.

Style of play
Sentimenti was known for his ability to save penalties, and once stopped nine consecutive spot-kicks during his career.

Personal life
The Sentimenti family were prominent in Italian football, several of Lucidio's relatives in the game include his brothers; Ennio, Lucidio, Vittorio and Primo, his cousins Lino and nephews Roberto and Andrea Sentimenti.

Honours

References

1914 births
1997 deaths
Parma Calcio 1913 managers
Italian footballers
Serie A players
S.S.C. Napoli players
Palermo F.C. players
A.C. Carpi players
Modena F.C. players
S.S.C. Napoli managers
S.S. Juve Stabia managers
Association football goalkeepers
Italian football managers
Sportspeople from the Province of Modena